Line most often refers to:
 Line (geometry), object that has zero thickness and curvature and stretches to infinity
 Telephone line, a single-user circuit on a telephone communication system

Line, lines, The Line, or LINE may also refer to:

Arts, entertainment, and media

Films 
 Lines (film), a 2016 Greek film
 The Line (2022 film)
 The Line (2017 film)
 The Line (2009 film)
 The Line, a 2009 independent film by Nancy Schwartzman

Podcasts 

 The Line (podcast), 2021 by Dan Taberski

Literature
 Line (comics), a term to describe a subset of comic book series by a publisher
 Line (play), by Israel Horovitz, 1967
 Line (poetry), the fundamental unit of poetic composition
 "Lines" (poem), an 1837 poem by Emily Brontë
 The Line (memoir), by Arch and Martin Flanagan
 The Line (play), by Timberlake Wertenbaker, 2009

Music

Albums
 Lines (The Walker Brothers album), 1976
 Lines (Pandelis Karayorgis album), 1995
 Lines (Unthanks album), 2018

Songs
 "Line" (song), 2017 single by Triana Park
 "Lines" (song), 1976 single by The Walker Brothers
 "The Line" (Foo Fighters song), 2017
 "The Line" (Lisa Stansfield song), 1997
 "The Line" (Raye song), 2017
 "Line", 2018 song by The Story So Far from Proper Dose
 "LINE", 2015 single by Sukima Switch
 "The Line", 2010 single by Battles
 "The Line", 2000 song by Sadist from Lego
 "The Line", 1995 song by Bruce Springsteen from The Ghost of Tom Joad

Other uses in music
 Line (melody), a linear succession of musical tones that the listener perceives as a single entity
 Line (music) or part, a strand or melody of music played by an individual instrument or voice

Television
 The Line (game show), a 2014 American game show
 The Line (TV series), a Canadian television series
 "The Line" (Heroes), a 2007 episode of the American television series Heroes
 The Line, a 2021 documentary series directed by Jeff Zimbalist and Doug Shultz

Business 

Below the line, an advertising term
Bottom line, or profit line, net profit
 Line function, primary business activity that negatively affects income if interrupted
 Line item, an accounting term
 Line of business, a product or set of related products
 Poverty line, an economics term
 Product lining, offering several related products for sale individually

Computing and telecommunications
 Line (electrical engineering), any circuit or loop of an electrical system
 Line level, a common standard for audio signals
 Transmission line, a specialized structure designed to carry alternating current of radio frequency
 Line (text file), a row of characters as a unit of organization within text files
 Line (video), a measure of video display resolution or image resolution
 Line Corporation, a Tokyo-based technology company
 Line (software), a social messaging application operated by Line Corporation

Mathematics and geometry
 Line (unit), an obsolete unit of length equal to one-twelfth or one-tenth of an inch

Military

Land warfare
Line (formation), standard tactical formation of forces
 Line infantry, line formation of infantrymen who were part of the "Line Regiments"
 'Lines' is another word for fortifications

Sea warfare
Line of battle, in naval warfare, a line of warships
 Line officer,  (naval) officer qualified to command a vessel

People 
 Line (given name), a Scandinavian female given name
Line (singer) (born 1996), a Danish singer and finalist in the Danish X Factor
 Lines (surname)
 The Lines family of Birmingham, England, including:
 Samuel Lines (1778–1863) and his sons
 Samuel Rostill Lines (1804–1833)
 Frederick Thomas Lines (1808–1898)
 Henry Harris Lines (1800 or 1801–1889)

Places 
 Líně, a municipality and village in the Czech Republic
 Linesøya, an island in the municipality of Åfjord in Norway
 The Line, Saudi Arabia, a planned city in Saudi Arabia
 Line Islands, an island group in the central Pacific
 The Line (sculpture trail), based on the Greenwich Meridian, in South East and East London

Science  
 Fault line, a geological term
 Inbred line, either of:
 Inbred strain or linear organisms, model organisms that are nearly genetically identical and are used in laboratories
 Products of line breeding, a technique in animal and plant agriculture and horticulture
 Lineage (evolution), a sequence of species that form a line of descent
 Long interspersed nuclear element, or LINE, a DNA sequence of two non-overlapping reading frames, accounting for 21% of human DNA
  Maxwell (unit), the unit of magnetic flux, formerly called line

Sports

Flexible ligatures
 Fishing line,  used (or intended) for angling
 Kite line, cord for kite flying

Competitive sports
 Line (ice hockey), group of forwards that play in a group, or "shift", during a game
 Line and length, direction, and distance,  to  first bounce on the pitch, in delivery in cricket
 Line of scrimmage, in American and Canadian football
 Racing line, in auto racing, path taken through a corner

Transport 
 Airline, a company that provides air transport services for traveling passengers and freight
 Log-line, in nautical usage, a piece of rope which has been assigned a function
 Shipping line, a company engaged in sea transport
 Railway line, a railway route or service
 Waterline, the line where the hull of a ship meets the surface of the water

Other uses 
 The Line, a website and social media campaign promoting respectful relationships, run by Our Watch in Australia
 LINE (combat system), a martial arts system
 Line (graphics), a narrow field between two points
 Line (heraldry), used to divide and vary fields and charges in heraldry
 Queue area, known in American English as a place to stand "in line"
 Writing lines, a form of school punishment

See also 
 A-line (clothing), a style of skirt or dress
 Line cook, a chef who works a station in a professional restaurant
 Linear (disambiguation)
 Liner (disambiguation)
 Lining (disambiguation)
 Lyne (disambiguation)
 Iine (disambiguation)